Jean-Baptiste Lagimodière (25 December 1778 in Trois-Rivières, Quebec – 7 September 1855 in Saint-Boniface, Manitoba) was a French-Canadian trapper employed in the fur trade by the Hudson's Bay Company in Rupert's Land.

Lagimodière is noted both as the grandfather of Métis leader Louis Riel, and as the husband of Marie-Anne Gaboury, the first woman of European descent to travel to and settle in western Canada. The Lagimodières were also, in 1812, the first settlers at the Red River Colony near modern Winnipeg, Manitoba.

He is portrayed by John Juliani in the 1978 film Marie-Anne. The Winnipeg section of Manitoba Highway 59, known formally as Winnipeg Route 20, in the eastern part of the city, is named Lagimodière Boulevard after him.

References

External links
Biography at the Dictionary of Canadian Biography Online

1778 births
Canadian fur traders
1855 deaths
People from Chambly, Quebec
Persons of National Historic Significance (Canada)
Riel family (Canada)